James Francis Buccheri (born 12 November 1968) is a baseball player who competed in the 2004 Summer Olympics.

Buccheri played high school baseball at Vero Beach High School in Vero Beach, Florida and Cibola High School in New Mexico. He accepted a scholarship to play college baseball at the University of New Mexico but transferred to Golden West College. He was selected in the 24th round of the 1988 Major League Baseball Draft by the Oakland Athletics after hitting .444 and stealing 46 bases in a season of community college baseball. He had committed to continue his college baseball career at Cal State Fullerton but chose to sign with the Athletics after failing to make the United States national baseball team which played at the 1988 Summer Olympics.

He began his professional career with the Southern Oregon A's of the Northwest League and played in affiliated Minor League Baseball until 2000, reaching as high as Triple-A. He went on to play several seasons in the Italian Baseball League.

References

1968 births
Living people
American expatriate baseball players in Canada
American expatriate baseball players in Mexico
American people of Italian descent
Baseball players at the 2004 Summer Olympics
Binghamton Mets players
Durham Bulls players
American expatriate baseball players in Italy
American expatriate baseball players in San Marino
Huntsville Stars players
Madison Muskies players
Modesto A's players
Norfolk Tides players
Olympic baseball players of Italy
Orlando Rays players
Ottawa Lynx players
Reno Silver Sox players
Southern Oregon A's players
Sportspeople from Brooklyn
Baseball players from New York City
St. Petersburg Devil Rays players
Tacoma Tigers players
2006 World Baseball Classic players